Variecolactone is a bio-active ascomycete isolate.

References

Ascomycota
Heterocyclic compounds with 5 rings
Lactones
Isopropenyl compounds